Ražanac is a municipality in Croatia in the Zadar County. According to the 2011 census, there are 2,940 inhabitants, 98% of which are Croats.

The settlements in the municipality are:
 Jovići (population 344)
 Krneza (population 177)
 Ljubač (population 475)
 Radovin (population 549)
 Ražanac (population 943)
 Rtina (population 452)

References

Municipalities of Croatia
Populated places in Zadar County